Lumbardh Salihu (born 18 November 1992) is a professional footballer who plays as an attacking midfielder for Austrian club FC Mistelbach.

Career

Youth career
On 2005. Salihu started the career at Floridsdorfer AC. While, on 2008 was on loan for a year to Brigittenau.

Wiener Linien
On 1 July 2009. Salihu signed to Wiener Stadtliga side Wiener Linien.

L.A. Riverside
On 1 July 2010. Salihu signed to L.A. Riverside.

Wienerberg
On 1 January 2011. Salihu signed to Wiener Stadtliga side Wienerberg. On 13 March 2011, he making his debut in a 1–2 away win against Landstraßer after coming on as a substitute at 61st minute in place of Denis Gavrilovic.

Northampton Town
On 29 July 2011. Salihu signed to League Two side Northampton Town. On 23 August 2011, he made his debut in a 4–0 defeat against Wolverhampton Wanderers in an EFL Cup match and after debut Gary Johnson, the Northampton Town manager said of his debut that "He's only just come back from an injury and he's only 18 so it was one of those where we just wanted to give him a little feel for it".

Austria Klagenfurt and Annabichler SV
On 4 July 2012. Salihu signed to Regionalliga Mitte side Austria Klagenfurt and in 2013–14 season, he also came to Landesliga Kärnten side Annabichler SV (farm team).

Post SV Wien
On 1 January 2015. Salihu signed to Wiener Stadtliga side Post SV Wien. On 27 February 2015, he making his debut in a 0–0 away draw against Ostbahn XI after being named in the starting line-up.

Regionalliga Ost
He played for some the Regionalliga Ost teams as with Oberwart (2015–2016), 1. SC Sollenau (2016) and SV Schwechat (2016–2017).

Llapi
On 21 January 2017. Salihu signed to Football Superleague of Kosovo side Llapi.

Haitzendorf
On 1 July 2017. Salihu signed to 1. Niederösterreichische Landesliga side Haitzendorf. On 12 August 2017, he making his debut in a 1–1 home draw against Rohrbach/Gölsen after coming on as a substitute at 46th minute in place of Benjamin Pasic.

References

External links
 Profile - ÖEFB

1992 births
Living people
People from Gjilan
Austrian people of Kosovan descent
Austrian people of Albanian descent
Kosovan emigrants to Austria
Kosovan expatriates in Austria
Association football midfielders
Austrian footballers
Kosovan footballers
Northampton Town F.C. players
SK Austria Klagenfurt players
SV Schwechat players
KF Llapi players
Football Superleague of Kosovo players
Austrian expatriate footballers
Kosovan expatriate footballers
Expatriate footballers in England
Austrian expatriate sportspeople in England
Kosovan expatriate sportspeople in England